Pinchas Shapiro of Koretz (1726 – 10 September 1791) was a Galician Chasidic rabbi and disciple of the Baal Shem Tov.

Biography
He was the son of Rabbi Avraham Abba Shapiro and Sora Rochel Shapiro. Pinchas's father was a descendant of Rabbi Nathan Nata Spira, the author of Megaleh Amukot. His son Moshe was born in 1759.

Born in Shklov, Pinchas was named after his paternal grandfather, described as "the famous and great scholar Rabbi Pinchas from Shklov."

References

1726 births
1791 deaths
18th-century Polish–Lithuanian rabbis
Hasidic rebbes
Jewish theologians
Orthodox rabbis from Galicia (Eastern Europe)